HMS Zinnia was a  that served in the Royal Navy.

She was built at Smiths Dock Company, South Bank-on-Tees, launched on 28 November 1940 and commissioned on 30 March 1941.

She protected convoys in the North Atlantic during the Second World War as part of the Battle of the Atlantic.

See also
 Zinnia (A961), an ancient Belgian military boat

External links
 HMS Zinnia on the Arnold Hague database at convoyweb.org.uk.

 

Flower-class corvettes of the Royal Navy
Ships sunk by German submarines in World War II
World War II shipwrecks in the Atlantic Ocean
Maritime incidents in August 1941
1940 ships
Ships built on the River Tees